Janthinomyia is a genus of flies in the family Tachinidae.

Species
 Janthinomyia elegans (Matsumura, 1905)
 Janthinomyia felderi Brauer & Bergenstamm, 1893

References

Tachinidae
Diptera of Asia